Marie Ljalková-Lastovecká (3 December 1920 – 7 November 2011) was a Czech sniper and member of the Czech Army who fought in exile in World War II.

Personal life
Ljalková (born Petrušáková) was born in Horodenka, Poland (today in Ukraine) to a family of Volhynian Czechs. She lost her parents at the age of 12 and then lived with her aunt in Stanisławów (today Ivano-Frankivs'k, Ukraine) where she met her first husband, Michal Ljalko. After the World War she remarried twice.

World War II
After the German attack on the Soviet Union, Ljalková together with her husband joined the First Czechoslovak Independent Field Battalion as a volunteer in March 1942, aged 21. She then underwent a medical course and three-month sniper course in Buzuluk.

Her first combat experience came during the three-day Battle of Sokolovo (8–11 March 1943) when she was credited with killing seven German soldiers, earning her immediate ace status. Her performance was even noticed by Nazi anti-Czechoslovak propaganda in the occupied Czech lands (in order to stress the outlandish character of the Czechoslovak military unit.).

Ljalková later became a sniper instructor of the Czechoslovak and Soviet infantry. After the women were withdrawn from combat units in 1944, she became a head medic of the Czechoslovak tank battalion.

Awards
She was credited with at least 30 confirmed kills during the war. This number is not exact according to Ljalková's own words, because the real numbers are not known. She was awarded the Soviet Order of the Red Star and the Czechoslovak War Cross.

Post World War II
After the war, she studied medicine and worked as a military doctor in Olomouc and at the Central Military Hospital in Prague. She later moved to Brno hospital where she met her second husband, Václav Lastovecký. She eventually attained the rank of colonel, but due to health problems she left the army and started to work as a tour guide for Russian-speaking tourists. She spent the rest of her life in Brno.

On 28 October 2010, she received the Order of the White Lion, Second Class, the Czech Republic's second highest military honour.

References

Sources
 Láník, Jaroslav - Vojenské osobnosti československého odboje 1939-1945 (2005) 
 Benešová, Hana - Máme snajperku!, Reflex.cz (2009)
 Jičínská, Vendula - Zdravotnice vzala pušku a šla do první linie, Brněnský deník (2008)
 hrad.cz - Prezident udělil státní vyznamenání, hrad.cz (2010)

External links

1920 births
People from Horodenka
Czech military doctors
Czech people of World War II
Women in World War II
Women in the Russian and Soviet military
Czechoslovak military personnel of World War II
Grand Officers of the Order of the White Lion
Recipients of the Czechoslovak War Cross
2011 deaths
Polish emigrants to Czechoslovakia
Czechoslovak Army officers